

Whitney is both a masculine and feminine given name.

Females 

 Whitney Able (born 1982), American actress
 Whitney Ashley (born 1989), American athlete
 Whitney Avalon, American actress
 Whitney Blake (1926–2002), American actress
 Whitney Bourne (1914–1998), American actress
 Whitney Chadwick, American historian
 Whitney Conder (born 1988), American wrestler
 Whitney Cummings (born 1982), American comedian, actress and television producer
 Whitney Crothers Dilley, American professor
 Whitney Dylan (born 1976), American actress
 Whitney Engen (born 1987), American soccer player
 Whitney Gardner, Canadian author
 Whitney Gaskell (born 1972), American author
 Whitney Genoway (born 1986), Canadian water polo player
 Whitney Hedgepeth (born 1971), American backstroke swimmer who won two silver medals at the 1996 Summer Olympics
 Whitney Wolfe Herd (born 1989), American entrepreneur
 Whitney Houston (1963–2012), American singer and actress
 Whitney Issik, Canadian politician
 Whitney Jensen, American ballet dancer
 Whitney Kershaw (1962), American actress
 Whitney McVeigh (born 1968), American artist
 Whitney Otto, American novelist
 Whitney Port (born 1985), star of The City on MTV
 Whitney Rose (born 1986), American country musician
 Whitney Sloan (1988), British actress
 Whitney Thompson (born 1987), winner of America's Next Top Model, Cycle 10
 Whitney Tyson, Filipino actress, singer and comedian.
 Whitney Udelson, American product manager
 Whitney Way Thore (born 1984), American television personality
 Whitney Westerfield (born 1980), American politician
 Whitney Williams, American businesswoman and political candidate

Males 

 Whitney Anderson (born 1931), American politician
 A. Whitney Brown (born 1952), American actor, comedian, writer
 Whit Johnson (born 1982), American journalist
 Whitney Mercilus (born 1990), American football player
 Whitney North Seymour (1901–1983), American lawyer
 Whitney North Seymour Jr. (1923–2019), American politician
 Whitney Smith (1940–2016), American professional vexillologist
 Whitney Straight (1912–1979), American Grand Prix motor racing driver, aviator, businessman
 Whitney Young (1921–1971), American civil rights leader

Fictional characters 
 Whitney, a fictional character from the Animal Crossing series
 Whitney, a fictional character from the PBS children's TV series Barney & Friends
 Whitney, a Gym Leader in the Pokémon series
 Whitney Dean, a fictional character in BBC soap opera EastEnders
 Whitney Conway Ellsworth, a fictional character on the HBO series Deadwood
 Whitney Russell, a fictional character on the NBC soap opera Passions
 Whitney Fordman, a fictional character on the TV series Smallville

See also 
 
 Whitney (surname)
 Witney (name)

References

English given names
English-language unisex given names
English-language feminine given names
English-language masculine given names
English unisex given names
English feminine given names
English masculine given names
Feminine given names
Masculine given names
Unisex given names